The Lentitheciaceae are a family of fungi in the order of Pleosporales. They are found world-wide (within China, Egypt, Hungary, Italy, Japan, Russia, Saudi, Thailand, UK and Uzbekistan,) with the greatest contributions found in Europe and Australia.

In a phylogenetic study of Lophiostoma and Massarina species, Lentithecium was proposed in 2009 based on Lophiostoma fluvitale now called Lentithecium fluviatile . Lentitheciaceae is a well supported clade.

Lentitheciaceous taxa are saprobic (living on dead tissue) on herbaceous and woody plants having narrow peridia, fusiform to broadly cylindrical pseudoparaphyses (sterile, thread-like filaments), hyaline (glassy appearance) ascospores with 1–3-transverse septa and containing refractive globules, surrounded by a mucilaginous sheath or extended appendage-like sheaths and asexual morphs producing stagonospora-like or dendrophoma-like asexual morphs. They are found in terrestrial or aquatic habitats.

Taxonomy
Genera accepted by the GBIF include:
 Aquilomyces  (5)
 Coenosphaeria 
 Darksidea  (17)
 Flavomyces  (2)
 Halobyssothecium  (2)
 Katumotoa  (2)
 Keissleriella  (54)
 Lentithecium  (13)
 Murilentithecium  (5)
 Neoophiosphaerella  (2)
 Poaceascoma  (7)
 Setoseptoria  (11)
 Suttonomyces  (3)
 Tingoldiago  (4)
 Towyspora 
 Zopfinula 

Figures in brackets are approx. how many species per genus.

References

Bibliography
 
 Zhang Y, Schoch CL, Fournier J, Crous PW, Gruyter J De, Woudenberg JHC, Hirayama K, Tanaka K, Pointing SB, Hyde KD. 2009. Multi-locus phylogeny of the Pleosporales: a taxonomic, ecological and evolutionary re-evaluation. Studies in Mycology 64: 85–102.

External links

Pleosporales
Dothideomycetes families
Taxa described in 2009